Micon the Younger of Athens, simply Micon or Mikon was an ancient Greek painter and sculptor from the middle of the 5th century BC. He was closely associated with Polygnotus of Thasos, in conjunction with whom he adorned the Stoa poikile ("Painted Portico"), at Athens, with paintings of the Battle of Marathon and other battles. He also painted in the Anakeion at Athens. His daughter was the painter Timarete.

References

5th-century BC Greek sculptors
Ancient Greek sculptors
Ancient Greek painters
Ancient Athenian sculptors
5th-century BC painters